United Dalit Students' Forum was a socio-cultural organization formed at Jawaharlal Nehru University, Delhi on 6 December 1991 by students.

See also
Birsa Ambedkar Phule Students' Association
Ambedkar Students' Association

References

Student organisations in India
Dalit politics